Public Achievement is an "initiative" of the Center for Democracy and Citizenship at Augsburg University.  It involves young people working in teams on a public works project of their choice. An adult coach, typically a teacher or university student trained in the process and concepts of Public Achievement, guides team members through the following stages: exploration and discovery; issue selection and development; problem research; designing a project; implementing the action plan and making the work visible; and celebrating. Throughout the process, the coach holds team members accountable, and creates space for reflection and opportunities for each team member to practice and refine their civic skills. The coach makes overt connections between the group’s work and civic and political concepts. Ideally, an experienced PA site coordinator provides mentoring and assists PA coaches in reflecting on their own learning.

Public Achievement was designed to give young people the opportunity to be producers and creators of their schools and their communities, not simply customers or clients. The goals of Public Achievement in its pilot project stage were to test whether young people could learn to influence problems in their schools and neighborhoods in a serious way, to define this work in political terms, and to integrate civic education, including a rich vocabulary of civic concepts such as “citizen teacher,” into institutions that work with young people. 

Through communication with Public Achievement participants, the Center for Democracy and Citizenship identifies best practices and incorporates them into PA training and materials. The CDC produces training guides and instructional DVDs and maintains a Public Achievement web site with a variety of materials to support PA teams, coaches, and site coordinators.

History

Public Achievement was created in 1990 by Harry Boyte, co-director of the Center for Democracy and Citizenship, in partnership with several other collaborators. It grew out of a series of focus groups with more than 200 young people in which participants were asked about problems in their schools and communities, and about their views on politics and public life. These young people were capable of listing any number of problems, but saw themselves outside of the solutions and outside politics and public life.

A variety of evaluations have found that PA is successful in developing young people’s confidence, communications and problem-solving skills, and ability to work effectively with others. In 1997 it was featured as a model of youth civic education by the National Commission on Philanthropy and Civic Renewal, co-chaired by William Bennett and Sam Nunn. In 2005, it was cited as an approach to civic education in the Civic Mission of Schools report of the Carnegie Corporation and CIRCLE. In 2007, Public Achievement was a finalist for the prestigious Carl Bertelsmann prize, an international award for "innovative approaches and outstanding ideas that help shape and further develop democratic societies."

Public Achievement in the United States

The Center for Democracy and Citizenship has worked with partners to bring Public Achievement to 22 countries. In the United States, PA is well established in Minnesota, Colorado, Missouri and New Hampshire, where CDC staff have trained faculty in leadership and service learning programs who then train university students as PA coaches in their leadership or service learning courses; CDC staff have provided assistance to faculty in developing PA sites through partnerships with local K-12 schools. In 2008, the CDC began a collaboration with the American Association of State Colleges and Universities to promote PA in community partnerships and in college curricula across the country. A dozen state colleges and universities are now adopting PA in Wisconsin, Kentucky, Arizona, Texas, Georgia, Connecticut, Vermont, Florida, Oregon, North Carolina, and Indiana.

Expansion of Public Achievement internationally

In 2000, staff of the Center for Democracy and Citizenship trained Catholic and Protestant educators who launched Public Achievement as a method of conflict resolution in Northern Ireland. In 2000 and 2003, a CDC staff person attended Salzburg Global seminars as a participant and speaker and initiated relationships with potential partners in Argentina, Brazil, Turkey, Poland, and the Palestinian Territories. 

In 2006, a staff member of the Center for Democracy and Citizenship was invited by the Educational Society for Malopolska (MTO) in Poland to lead Public Achievement training for educators and school administrators from the Balkans. Later that year, CDC staff conducted training and provided technical consultation at a regional conference organized by MTO for more than 200 educators and young people using Public Achievement in the Balkans, Turkey, and Poland. In 2008, MTO led training for trainers in the Kharkov and Odessa regions of Ukraine, where local partners want to make Ukraine a center of Public Achievement. MTO also led training for trainers in the Visegrád Group countries, where there are now 19 sites. 

Through site visits to the United States by Polish, Turkish, and Palestinian partners, visits by center staff to Poland and Turkey, and in follow-up consultations, CDC staff have trained trainers and provided ongoing mentoring and technical assistance.

Public Achievement in the Middle East

In the West Bank, Gaza Strip and Jordan, PA (“Popular Achievement”) has been supported by the American Friends Service Committee (AFSC) since 2003. As in Eastern and Central Europe, PA teams have addressed a wide range of issues such as treating drinking water, creating violence reduction programs, repairing a school, creating a handbook for disabled people, doing a village history, helping poor families, and creating a community library. An in-depth evaluation by the AFSC found that team participants learn to analyze local problems, communicate effectively, map and understand power, and build relationships with local organizations and authorities, while gaining confidence and civic identity in the process. In 2008, 756 young people from Gaza and the West Bank participated in PA.

References

Public economics